Breynia retusa is a species of plant in the family Phyllanthaceae.

Distribution
It grows naturally in Bangladesh, China, Bhutan, Cambodia, India, Laos, Malaysia (peninsular), Myanmar, Nepal, Sri Lanka, Thailand, Vietnam and Réunion where it is considered as an invasive weed.

The synonysation of Sauropus elegantissimus that is known to be endemic to Malaysia is disputed. Under this name, this plant is listed as critically endangered, but it is unclear what effect an updated taxonomy would have on that rating.

References

retusa
Flora of Réunion
Flora of China
Flora of the Indian subcontinent
Flora of Indo-China
Flora of Peninsular Malaysia
Taxonomy articles created by Polbot